The 1920 Brunswick state election was held on 16 May 1920 to elect the 60 members of the Landtag of the Free State of Brunswick.

Results

References 

Brunswick
Elections in Lower Saxony